Income inequality is amount to which income is distributed unequally in a population. Income inequality before and after taxes has risen significantly since the 1970s.

Controversies and arguments  
Critiques of income inequality often refer to a casual chain linking unequal growth to a lessened economy. Unequal growth concentrates wealth in a small amount on consumers who can only buy so many things. As a result, the vast majority of people are left with little extra cash for goods and services thus less things are bought and the economy generates less capital than it otherwise might.

Proponents of income inequality often reject the idea of increased government intervention in the markets which is inevitable if income inequality is to be fixed. Among the most notable arguments for income inequality are those concerning the natural effects of capitalism and the free markets. These arguments point out the fact that unequal rewards are natural in a system that is structured for inequality. Furthermore, an opinion that the amount of money earned in a free market system are to be kept by the earner.

Wage gap in recent years 
The average real income for the top 1% of Ohioans grew by 111.2% between 1979 and 2007. Incomes which are adjusted for inflation have the top 1 percent in Ohio growing 70% between 1979 and 2011, but the rest had a falling average of 7.7%. Over the last decade incomes for the bottom 2% in Ohio dropped by 6.9%. Ohio's overall income grew in Ohio from 2009 to 2012. Ohio had an overall 7.1% increase in income growth, the top 1% had a 37.0% in income growth and the bottom 99% grew their income by 2.3%. The top 1% had a 71.9% of the overall shared income.

Household inequality 
Household inequality is the extent to which income is distributed unequally among people living in a houses collectively in a population. In 2009 the average household income for the poorest 20% of Ohioans was $20,500. The average household income for the middle 20% of Ohioans was $58,100. The average household income for the richest 5% of Ohioans was $221,800.

Notes 

Income distribution
Economic inequality in the United States